Arenimonas taoyuanensis is a Gram-negative, aerobic and rod-shaped bacterium from the genus of Arenimonas which has been isolated from soil from a rice field from Taoyuan Village in China.

References

Xanthomonadales
Bacteria described in 2016